The shrike-babblers are a group of small birds in the genus Pteruthius. They are native to the Indomalayan realm, and were traditionally placed in the family Timaliidae before molecular phylogenetic studies in 2007 found that they were best considered as belonging to the family Vireonidae which was then thought to be restricted to the New World. They were traditionally classified into five species with several subspecies but changes in the status of these species on the basis of the phylogenetic species concept suggest more forms in a cryptic species complex. Most species are found in montane forests, with some species descending down to lower altitudes during the winter.

The shrike-babblers range in size from 11.5–20 cm in length and weigh 10-48 g. They are divergent in plumage and size but all possess a stout black hooked bill, short rictal bristles and a distinctive juvenile plumage. They all exhibit sexual dimorphism in plumage, with the males generally brighter. The song is simple and monotonous.

None of the species are considered threatened by human activities.

Taxonomy and systematics
The genus was created by Swainson in 1832 based on the etymology that their wings were red. The emended spelling of Ptererythrius suggested by Strickland was used by some works but dropped as unjustified in later works. The name Allotrius was used by Temminck in 1838 but Swainson's name has priority. 
The genus characteristics include a short bill with the culmen sharply ridged with hooked and notched tip. The nostril openings are oval and covered by some rictal bristles. The first primary is less than half the length of the second. The scales on the front of the tarsus are sometimes fused to form a long scutum.

Extant species
Based on the differences established by the phylogenetic studies and on the basis of call variations, the group has been classified into seven species:

Former species
Formerly, some authorities also considered the following species (or subspecies) as species within the genus Pteruthius:
 Robust whistler (as Pteruthius spinicaudus)

References

External links

Taxonomy articles created by Polbot